Sneakerheads is an American comedy streaming television series created by Jay Longino that premiered on Netflix on September 25, 2020.

Cast and characters

 Allen Maldonado as Devin
 Andrew Bachelor as Bobby
 Jearnest Corchado as  Nori
 Matthew Josten as Stuey
 Yaani King as Christine
 Justin Lee as Cole
 Aja Evans as Gia

Episodes

Production

Development
On August 17, 2020, Netflix picked up Sneakerheads for a series consisting of 6 episodes. The series was created by Jay Longino, who also executive produced alongside Inny Clemons, Justin Killion, Will Gluck, Richard Schwartz, Kevin Mann, Brendan Bragg, Jason Belleville, Rod Grable, and Dave Meyers. The series premiered on September 25, 2020.

Casting
Upon series picked up announcement, it was reported that Allen Maldonado, Andrew Bachelor, Jearnest Corchado, Matthew Josten, Yaani King, Justin Lee, and Aja Evans were cast in starring roles.

Reception
For the series, review aggregator Rotten Tomatoes reported an approval rating of 57% based on 7 reviews, with an average rating of 5/10. Metacritic gave the series a weighted average score of 47 out of 100 based on 4 reviews, indicating "mixed or average reviews".

References

External links

2020 American television series debuts
2020s American comedy television series
English-language Netflix original programming
Television shows set in Los Angeles